Cesar Murillo (born February 16, 1996) is an American soccer player who plays as a defender for Lexington SC in USL League One.

Career

North Texas SC
Prior to the inaugural USL League One season, in March 2019, Murillo joined North Texas SC, signing a one year deal with an option for a second. He made his professional debut on 5 May 2019, coming on as a 75th-minute substitute for Johan Gomez in a 1-0 away victory over Murillo's future club, the Greenville Triumph.

Greenville Triumph SC
In February 2020, Murillo moved to the Greenville Triumph on a free transfer.

Forward Madison FC
In February 2022, Forward Madison FC, also of USL League One, announced it had signed Murillo for the 2022 season.

Lexington SC
On March 15, 2023, Murillo signed with USL League One side Lexington SC ahead of their inaugural season.

Honors

Club
North Texas SC
USL League One: 2019

Greenville Triumph SC
USL League One: 2020

References

External links
 
 Cesar Murillo at College of Charleston Athletics

1996 births
Living people
American soccer players
Association football defenders
North Texas SC players
Greenville Triumph SC players
Forward Madison FC players
Lexington SC players
Soccer players from El Paso, Texas
USL League One players